Spring Mountain is a developing locality in the City of Ipswich, Queensland, Australia.

History 
Spring Mountain was developed as part of Greater Springfield, Queensland Australia's largest master-planned community.

Since then, land in the north-east of the locality has been developed for residential use and land sales are occurring and housing constructed.

Spring Mountain State School opened in 2019, with 55 pupils were enrolled on the first day of the first term. It was built with a maximum capacity of 760 students.

Education 

Spring Mountain State School is a government primary (Prep-6) school for boys and girls at 56 Dublin Avenue. In 2020, the school had an enrolment of 195 students with 18 teachers (17 full-time equivalent) and 6 non-teaching staff (less than 5 full-time equivalent).

There are no secondary schools in Spring Mountain. The nearest government secondary school is Springfield Central State High School in neighbouring Springfield Central to the north-east.

Transport 

Spring Mountain has been served by a bus route since January 2020. The service comprises a loop service from Spring Mountain to Orion Shopping Centre and Springfield Central railway station, running twice an hour on weekdays.

References 

City of Ipswich
Localities in Queensland